Linus Joseph "Len" Arsenault (March 24, 1934 – February 21, 1999) was a Canadian politician. He represented the electoral district of Cape Breton North in the Nova Scotia House of Assembly from 1978 to 1981. He was a member of the Nova Scotia New Democratic Party.

Biography
Arsenault was born in New Waterford, Nova Scotia. He attended St. Francis Xavier University and was a teacher in Alberta and Nova Scotia. In 1980, Arsenault was a candidate for the leadership of the NDP, finishing second to Alexa McDonough. Arsenault died on February 21, 1999.

References

1934 births
1999 deaths
Nova Scotia New Democratic Party MLAs
People from New Waterford, Nova Scotia
St. Francis Xavier University alumni